The Paris Cockerels are the oldest French Australian football club still in activity. Created by a community of Australians living in Paris, it is mainly composed of French and Australian players. They were responsible for the organization of the first 'Coupe de France' of Australian football, on 28 June 2008.

Club history

1998-2005: the origins

The club was founded in 1998 with the help of James Blanchard of the embassy of Australia in Paris, who at the time was responsible for sports at the embassy. Back then, the club was only made up from expatriate Australians living in France. It was also at this time that the first 100% French team was created, the Tasmania Montivilliers, in Normandie. The two teams thus benefited from the organisation of the first Australian football game on the French territory since the First World War. The score has since been forgotten, but it is more than probable that the Parisian club won due to the experience of their Australian players. Unfortunately this encounter will never be repeated as the Normands would fold the following year.

There would be a long wait before the Cockerels would be able to return in 2004 to the European footy scene. That year would see two confrontations organised against the Brussels Saints, the first one taking place in Brussels and the second one in château de Thoiry.

The summer of 2005 saw the arrival of the first French players for the Cockerels. They did not have to wait long to take part in their first match, as on 5 September 2005, a very young team from Strasbourg arrived in Paris for their first match. Once again, thanks to the experience of the Australian players, the Parisians were able to win the match easily (75 to 37). From this match two players were selected to travel to London to represent France for the first European Cup in October 2005. Some month after this event, the club was officially formed, under the name of the Paris Cockerels and chaired by a Frenchman, Olivier Tresca.

The difficult years, 2006-2007

After 2005 the Parisian club ran into somewhat of a bad patch. The majority of the Australians left France, and there was not a lot of time and effort invested into the club. Very few new players were recruited, and only two or three players were turning up to the trainings. In fact French footy in general was in a difficult period, with problems of recruitment and a series of heavy defeats at the German championship for the club of Strasbourg. Despite everything the club resisted and waited for better days. At the same time, the club tried to organise the 2006 edition of the European Championship of Australian football, but due to many unforeseen force the organisers were forced to cancel the event.

2008-2013: rebirth of the club and first successes

In February 2008 the rebirth of the team begins with the arrival of Cyril Talon. His arrival corresponds to the revival of footy in France with the creation of the Bordeaux Bombers (in October) and the Montpellier Fire Sharks a few months later. In spring the club sees a wave of recruitment and for the first time in the club's history they play in their official colours.

After many unfruitful attempts, the Parisian are finally able to play a match and it is on this occasion the Strasbourg Kangaroos were able to take their revenge. On 31 May 2008, the Parisian set out for Strasbourg in spite of the absence of some of their key players. The Alsatian are able to inflict a severe defeat to the Parisians with 94–45 in a match that was eventually stopped by a violent storm.

With the creation of Bordeaux and Montpellier, the leaders of the French Australian Football  decided to organise the first Coupe de France of Australian football, it would be held in Paris on 28 June 2008.

This time the Parisian manpower is at full force and all the players eager to gain the title. All the forces of Australian Footy in France made the effort to be there for this historic day. In addition to the tournament, the organisers had arranged the demonstrations of the boomerang and the sales of Vegemite.
In spite of a hard ground, and the multiple injuries (especially among the Parisians) the Cockerels are able to down their rivals of Strasbourg, the score 57–28. This day marks the great return of the Parisians to a higher level of footy in France, and also predicts large things for the future of the game not only in Paris but also in France.

Following on from this victory, the Parisians are ready to receive the Dutchmen for the first match between the teams of Paris and Amsterdam. Deprived of many of their players through injury and also out played technically, the Parisians go down to a painful score of 56–143.

In 2009 the Paris Cockerels entered a new era of success, and looked to stamp themselves as the powerhouse of Australian Rules Football in France.
Popular captain Sebastian Sabogal led the Cockerels into 2009, and after a hard pre-season under Coach Graham Andrews they played their first match for 2009, a friendly, against the North London Lions at home.  It was the first time the Cockerels had hosted an 18-a-side match and Paris turned on a beautiful day at the Bois de Vincennes.
After a hard-fought encounter which saw the Cockerels leading with 10 minutes to play, North London eventually proved too good.  The final score was Lions 8.18.66, Paris 6.6.42.
On Sunday 29 May the Cockerels assembled in Montpellier to play their opening match for the 2009 French cup, against the Montpellier Firesharks.  The match was a good contest played in good spirits, and was Palli Finnssons first match as captain in the absence of Sabogal. The Cockerels were full of confidence after their good from against North London, and took that form into the 9 player form of the game, establishing a 7-goal lead by quarter time.  Despite some rough play from the firesharks, Paris were unfazed and ran away with a 22.13.145 to 11.8.74 victory.

There was one more friendly before the season continued, this time against the Flying Dutchmen in Amsterdam.  After many of the Cockerels players apparently stayed out until 6am in Amsterdam the night before the match, they lost the toss and kicked into a stiff breeze in the opening term. Consequently, Amsterdam kicked the first seven goals, and were never troubled, eventually winning 15.16.106 to 8.9.57.  The match would ultimately be Sabogal's swan song, and the team celebrated hard into the following Saturday night.

After an easy victory against the Bordeaux Bombers in Paris, the Cockerels travelled to Strasbourg for what was effectively a playoff for the championship with both teams standing undefeated.
In a slightly controversial result, Joey Maclean (playing in his one and only French Championship match) kicked 9 goals as the Cockerels rallied from a half time deficit to eventually win 103 - 61 and secure the first ever French Championship. 
The Cockerels also took out the French cup in Bordeaux.

Another French Premiership in 2009-2010 and two consecutive runners-up spots the following years, alongside a Coupe de France victory in 2011 cemented the cocks position as one of the powerhouses in French Aussie Rules football.

2013-2014: a new era begins

The 2013–2014 season is the beginning of a new cycle for the Paris Cockerels, with the renewal of most of the players. This new recruits wave is composed of both Aussie and French players, bringing a fresh spirit to the club.

Although the Cocks began the season with a single-point loss to the neighbours of Cergy-Pontoise, they enjoyed a winning streak next with wins at Bordeaux and Lyon and at home versus Strasbourg and Montpellier. The only setback in the meantime being a tough defeat given by the Hawks in Toulouse, the Cockerels made it to the finals.
In the preliminary final, they headed back to Bordeaux where they snatched a tight overtime victory, which marked the first overtime game in French Aussie Rules football history.
In the Grand Final, the Paris Cockerels suffered another loss in Toulouse, in a game that saw the Hawks grab their second straight title.

In the same 2013–2014 season, the Cockerels travelled to Glasgow to take part in the Haggis Cup. Suffering an injury in their first game, they had to play all day without any interchange players but almost managed to make it to the podium in the end, falling in the 4th spot.

The Paris Cockerelles, the club women's team was formed the same year. Lacking a few players and opponents in France they could not take part in an official game during their first season. However, new player arriving for the 2014–2015 season strengthened the side and they keep on improving all the time.

2014-2015: back to the top

Eager to improve after the previous year disappointing result, the Cockerels got back to work under a new coach Steven Ryan.
After remaining undefeated all-season long, the Paris Cockerels hosted the Montpellier Firesharks in the championship Grand Final on 27 June 2015. They finally ended their four-years Championship draught with a convincing win (27.16.178 to 9.8.62) that has been widely recognized as one of the best games in the history of French footy.
After the game, Steven Ryan, the Cockerels coach, released the following statement: "It's been called by some as the most devastating display of football ever seen in the national competition. Whatever your opinion, those players can be proud of the brand of football they delivered that day. It can only be good news for French football. Everyone to play in the future will now play catch up to the challenge that this team has laid down."

2015-2016: creation of the Paris Cockatoos

Following their Premiership win, the Paris Cockerels were confronted with a new problem, since too many players were part of the team, reducing dramatically the opportunities to take part into official games.

The solution was found with the creation of a second team: the Paris Cockatoos.
At the Cockatoos creation, their ranks have been filled with Cockerels, the original team being split into two balanced sides, giving everyone the opportunity to fulfill their potential.
Both teams are still training together but they are competing separately in the French Premiership.

The season 2015-2016 saw the first Paris derby, which was won by the newly founded Cockatoos (8.14.62 to 10.11.71) on 31 October 2015. On 25 June 2016, the Paris Cockatoos clinched the 2015/2016 National Championship defeating the Cergy-Pontoise Coyotes in the Grand Final in Bordeaux.

2016-2017: Footy in Jean Bouin 

With a title to defend, the Cockatoos, after a disappointing start, managed to reach again the Grand Final against Lyon, who eliminated the Cockerels in a huge semi-final. Played in Stade Jean-Bouin 30 April after the parisian Top14 Rugby derby, The Cockatoos drown their hope of a back to back, losing 104 - 41.

Trophies and results

French National Championship

French Cup

Paris International Rules Cup

2008-2009

Legend : G : Number of goals, O : Number of overs,B : Number of behinds, S : Final Score

Friendly matches

1998-2009

Legend : G : Number of goals, B : Number of behinds, S : Final Score

Team

Current roster

Paris Cockerels 2017-2018

Paris Cockatoos 2017-2018

Cockerelles team 2017-2018

Honour board

Club Founder 

 1998 :  James Blanchard

Club Presidents 

 2005 - 2008 :  Olivier Tresca
 2008 - 2010 :  Cyril Talon
 2010 - 2012 :  Maureen Bassard
 2012 - 2014 :  Sébastien Artus
 2014 - 2016 :  Bérengère Portal
 2016 -      :  Fanny Maillet

Club Coaches 

 2005 - 2008 :  Olivier Tresca
 2008 - 2011 :  Graham Andrews
 2011 - 2014 :   Andrew Senkans
 2014 - 2016 :  Steven Ryan
 2016 -      :  Mike Cowan

Club Captains 

 2005 - 2008 :  Olivier Tresca
 2008 - 2009 :  Sebastian Sabogal
 2009 - 2011 :  Páll Tómas Finnsson
 2011 - 2013 :  François Daniel
 2013 - 2015 :  Maxence Launais
 2015 -      :  Pierre Boscart (Cockerels) &  Clément Bouchet (Cockatoos)

Notable former players 

 2004 :  Richard McKenzie
 2005 :  Laurent Caravelle
 2005 :  Olivier Tresca
 2006 :  Guillaume Lebrun
 2006 :  Clément Charlet
 2006 :  David O'Hanlon
 2008 :  Cyril Talon
 2008 :  Graham Andrews
 2008 :  Páll Tómas Finnsson
 2008 :  Denis Schneider
 2008 :  Jérôme Loubet
 2008 :  Bertrand Lejeune
 2008 :  Jules Lecerf
 2008 :  Léo Filipetti
 2008 :  Nicholas Andrews
 2008 :  Sam Dawkins
 2008 :  Sebastian Sabogal
 2008 :  Trent Broadway
 2008 :  Cameron Miller
 2008 :  Nicolas Campo
 2009 :  Joey MacLean
 2009 :  Shannon Birchall
 2009 :  David Hislop
 2009 :  Mike Karas
 2009 :  Amaury Launais
 2009 :  Harold Courchay
 2009 :  Subajan Sivandran
 2009 :  Adam Sargon
 2009 :  Joel Booth
 2009 :  Dom Wenden
 2009 :  Sebastien Artus
 2009 :  Jean François Bouron
 2009 :  Ivan Price
 2009 :  Jacques Rossard (resumed playing for the club)
 2009 :  Edouard Cameron
 2009 :  Dan Andrews
 2010 :  Wilfried Houvion
 2011 :  Liam Wilson
 2013 :  Angus Mackintosh
 2013 :  Garrath Holdstock
 2013 :  Tim Milton-Hind
 2015 :  Aldwin Bevilacqua
 2015 :  Jérôme Fournier
 2015 :  Julien Aussoleil
 2015 :  Arnaud Bezard
 2015 :  Kevin Taulera
 2015 :  Hugo Basset
 2015 :  Hugh Atkin
 2015 :  Daniel Stephens
 2015 :  Mark Arnephy
 2015 :  Jake Calvert
 2015 :  Thomas Hedley
 2016 :  Andrew Moore
 2016 :  Maxence Launais
 2016 :  Jules Frossard
 2016 :  Stuart Saare
 2016 :  Camille Portal

External links

The site of the Paris Cockerels
Australian Rules Football
Australian rules football in France
Bordeaux Bombers

Australian rules football clubs in France
1998 establishments in France
Australian rules football clubs established in 1998
Sports clubs in Paris